Fernhill Heath railway station was an intermediate railway station on the Oxford, Worcester and Wolverhampton Railway between Worcester (Tunnel Junction) and Droitwich Spa.

History
The original station was opened by the Oxford, Worcester and Wolverhampton Railway on 18 February 1852; at first named Fearnall Heath, it was renamed Fernhill Heath on 1 July 1883.

The station was closed on 5 April 1965 due to the Beeching cuts, and little remains of the station. The footbridge was added in the early 1970s and was not part of the original station which operated a walk over crossing only.

In a document by Transport for West Midlands it was proposed that the station could reopen to passengers as a 'long-term' option.

References

Further reading

Disused railway stations in Worcestershire
Former Great Western Railway stations
Railway stations in Great Britain opened in 1852
Railway stations in Great Britain closed in 1965
Beeching closures in England
1852 establishments in England